Princess Charlotte of Wales may refer to:

 Princess Charlotte of Wales (1796–1817), the only child of George, Prince of Wales, later King George IV of the United Kingdom
 Princess Charlotte of Wales (1812 EIC ship), a ship named after the princess
 Princess Charlotte of Wales (born 2015), the second child and only daughter of William, Prince of Wales